The following is a list of indoor arenas in Kosovo, ordered by capacity. The venues are by their final capacity after construction for seating-only events. There is more capacity if standing room is included (e.g. for concerts).

Current arenas

Under construction/proposed

See also 
List of indoor arenas in Europe
List of indoor arenas by capacity

!
Kosovo
Indoor arenas